Richard Langmead, born 31 December 1972 in Llantrisant, Rhondda Cynon Taf, Wales, is a former rugby union player. An outside half, he played his club rugby for Treorchy RFC, Merthyr RFC, Llantrisant RFC and Pontypridd RFC.

He retired as a player in 2007 and began coaching at Old Illtydians RFC. In 2008, he became Team Manager at Pontypridd RFC.

Langmead is a manager at carpentry firm, GE Carpentry Ltd.

References

External links
 Pontypridd RFC profile

1972 births
Living people
Pontypridd RFC players
Rugby union players from Llantrisant
Welsh rugby union coaches
Welsh rugby union players